Michael Wojtanowicz (born 9 March 1985) is an Austrian footballer of Polish origin.

Career
Wojtanowicz began his professional career 2003 at the SV Pasching. For the first round of the 2004/05 season he was loaned to the SC Untersiebenbrunn. For the second half of the 2005/06 season he moved to TSV 1860 Munich II. After half a year there, he moved to FC Lustenau 07. For the season he went to the SKN St. Pölten. 2011 Wojtanowicz will leave the club after four successful seasons.

As of 10 August 2011 Michael is on trial at English League Two side Swindon Town managed by Paolo Di Canio.

References

1985 births
Living people
Austrian footballers
Polish footballers
Austrian people of Polish descent
FC Lustenau players
TSV 1860 Munich II players
First Vienna FC players
People from Krems an der Donau
Association football forwards
Footballers from Lower Austria